Frontiphantes is a monotypic genus of European dwarf spiders containing the single species, Frontiphantes fulgurenotatus. It was first described by J. Wunderlich in 1987, and has only been found in Portugal.

See also
 List of Linyphiidae species (A–H)

References

Linyphiidae
Monotypic Araneomorphae genera